VGM Group Spółka sp. z o.o. (Full name VGM Group Spółka spółka z ograniczoną odpowiedzialnością, Złota 61 / 100, 00-819 Warszawa, Polska) is Polish developer with Belarusian capital. Company started its projects in Gdańsk and Katowice and a few Belarusian projects explained below.

Owners of VGM Group Spółka sp. z o.o.

 Volokh Ilya Pavlovich (Ilya Volakh) – Belarusian and Polish businessman, owner of firms: sole entrepreneur Volokh I. P., “Zhilstroykomplekt” LLC, “Construction company “Zhilstroykomplekt”” LLC, “Generalnyj podriadchik” LLC, “Volokh Group” LLC, PBS Bud sp. z o.o. (Ul. Księcia Witolda 19 /24, 21-500, Biała Podlaska, Poland), VGM Group Spółka sp. z o.o. (Ul. Złota 61 /100, 00-819, Warszawa, Poland).
 Volokh Alesya Pavlovna (Alesia Volakh) – owns 1% of “Zhilstroykomplekt” LLC, she is also chief accountant of LLC. She owns sole entrepreneur Volokh A. P. and 10% of VGM Group Spółka sp. z o.o., approximately half of Community Park.

Financial schemes of affiliated entities
Volakh I.P. together with his wife and и chief accountant of developer A. P. Volakh created a few affiliated entities: Individual entrepreneur Volokh I.P., construction company “Zhilstroycomplekt”, “Generalnyj Podriadchik” LLC. There are documents, demonstrating that affiliated entities rented out construction company “Zhilstroycomplekt” construction equipment. According to this source, each of them both earned by withdrawal from developer more than million dollars for a year. Emitted by controlled “Zhilstroykomplekt” LLC housing bonds were collateralized by buildings of liquidated Kobryn Preserve factory whose stated price was approximately 27 times higher than their acquisition cost. Ministry of finance has reported that developer has not performed housing bonds obligations, and regulator has suspended circulation of bonds.

Projects

“Grushevskij Posad” housing complex 

One of the main projects of the company that is indicated at the company site – apartments in “Grushevskij Posad” housing complex, the project of “Apartment buildings with embedded commercial and administrative premises within the boundaries of Dzerzhinskogo Avenue and Shchorsa Street” in the city of Minsk (the developer is controlled by owners of VGM “Zhilstroykomplekt” LLC ). Construction of the first houses of complex has been started in 2011 and were commissioned in 2015–2017, but construction deadlines have been missed for many times. Further projects has been started  in 2016, developer issued housing bonds up to square meters has not ever been started to construct. Deadlines of construction of new objects have also been missed, at the beginning of 2020 (before any restrictions caused by pandemic) construction has been discontinued. The preparedness of objects has not been changed since beginning of the 2020: sections number 1 and 2 (the second stage of construction of the third building –90% readiness), sections 3 and 4 (the 7th stage of construction – 30% readiness) and the fourth building (the 9th stage of construction –4% readiness).

“Trilogia” housing complex 

“Trilogia” housing complex was planned as the biggest in Brest Region. Since 2014 until 2016 developer have not constructed because of lack of experience.
Since 2016 “Bug trade” LLC constructed the complex, that is gained fame after charges for stealing of money paid for leasing of commercial square in “Kirmash” trade center. “Zhilstroykomplekt” LLC is indicated as provider of service of complete engineering, organizer of  campaign to sell of flats, the third of them were sold for a short term. The complex have not been constructed for two years, two years were spent on piles installation, after that construction has been stopped.

“Karamel” residential quarter 
“Karamel” residential quarter planned as как architectural ensemble of 14 residential sections. “LadaGarant” CJSC  and “Zhilstroykomplekt” LLC are indicated as developers, the object is indicated at the site of VGM Spolka. Developers should be commissioned in August 2019, but its readiness was about 30% at the end of year. According to statement of  “LadaGarant”, deadlines has been missed because of "Generalnyj podriadchik" LLC (owned by Volokh I. P.) failed of construction materials supply. Construction was continued after involvement of authorities and reorganization of developer.

“Vest towers” housing complex 

At middle of the 2019 “Zhilstroykomplekt” LLC  started to construct “Vest towers” housing complex at Warsaw highway in the city of Brest. Complex is indicated at site of developer as one of project.

“Park” housing complex 

Construction of elite housing complex “Park” has been announced in 2018. It should be started in the center of Kobryn in the borders of  that is Natural monument of national significance. Object is indicated at the site of developer as one of the projects.

Controversy
Till 2015 “Construction company “Zhilstroykomplekt”” LLC  was contractor at “Grushevskij Posad” construction. As a result of its bankruptcy and liquidation, 45 companies subcontracted “Grushevskij Posad” lost their money. According to the report of Ministry of finance, Zhilstroykomplekt  have not performed its 36 series bonds obligations to pay interest income.

Relationship with law enforcement 
Multiple violation of Construction code were revealed, law enforcement officials confirmed it. Developer has been punished for driving in piles near constructing section that may reduce structural strength of building.
Volokh is under suspect  and is under investigation  in cases of fraudulent bankruptcy of construction company. Also, fulfilment of obligations for 28-29 set of bonds is significantly delayed, general contractor "Generalnyj podriadchik" LLC owned by the same people is under liquidation. This LLC is guarantor of collateralization of housing bonds of 34 series, and Ministry of finances ordered to Zhilstroykomplekt LLC change collateralization of issued housing bonds. “Construction company “Zhilstroykomplekt”” has been finally liquidated.

Publicity, response of authorities
Bondholders met with state officials for many times: meeting with officials of Minsk City Executive Committee, administration of Moscow district of Minsk. State officials promised to resolve this problem for many times: Deputy Moskowskiy District Chief, vice major, aide to president. A few episodes on TV were devoted to this problem, bondholders published public call to President of Belarus. Investigation against officials of Zhilstroykomplekt LLC has been suspended  because developer has not provided asked documents, after that Prosecutors Office ordered to continue investigation.  is tasked with confiscation of the objects.  Attracting new homebuyers for fund-raising is proposed to resolve the problem of long term constructed objects.

References

Real estate and property developers
Companies of Poland

park
major of Minsk
State Control Committee